Robert Michael "Mike" Walker (born September 14, 1948) is the former United States Under Secretary of the Army (1997-1998).

Biography
Walker was born in Martin, Tennessee, in 1948.  He attended Martin High School until 1965 and graduated from DeKalb County High School in Smithville, Tennessee in May 1966.  Walker then attended the University of Tennessee, Knoxville until January 1969, but did not earn a degree. He also studied at the University of Maryland, College Park in 1969.  From 1969-76, Walker worked as a staff assistant to Rep. Joe L. Evins (D–Tenn. 4).

Walker joined the staff of  Senator Jim Sasser (D–Tenn.) in 1977. He also served as an enlisted soldier in the Tennessee Army National Guard and District of Columbia Army National Guard in the 1970s.

From 1978-93, Walker served as a professional staff member of the United States Senate Committee on Appropriations and staff director of the United States Senate Appropriations Subcommittee on Military Construction.

In 1993, President of the United States Bill Clinton named Walker Assistant Secretary of the Army (Installations, Logistics and Environment) and Walker held this office 1993-97.

In 1997, President Clinton nominated Walker as United States Under Secretary of the Army, and he subsequently held this office from November 13, 1997 through October 15, 1998.  He was Acting United States Secretary of the Army from January 2, 1998 through July 2, 1998.

In 1998-1999, he was Deputy Director of the Federal Emergency Management Agency.

He then served as Acting Under Secretary of Veterans Affairs for Memorial Affairs, United States Department of Veterans Affairs from December 1999 until September 2000, at which point he was appointed as the first Under Secretary of Veterans Affairs for Memorial Affairs in the Department of Veterans Affairs, taking up his duties on September 2000.

In February 2001, Walker joined Plexus Scientific Corporation, serving as a senior vice president and later as chairman.

Walker has lectured at the Naval Postgraduate School's Center for Homeland Defense and Security.

Walker married Romy Pettersen.

References

 

1948 births
Living people
People from Martin, Tennessee
University of Tennessee alumni
University of Maryland, College Park alumni
Clinton administration personnel
Assistant Secretaries of the Army for Installations, Energy and Environment
United States Under Secretaries of the Army
Federal Emergency Management Agency officials